Doamna Stanca (died 1603) was a princess consort of Wallachia, Transylvania and Moldavia as the wife of Michael the Brave. 

Tradition says that they were married in the Proieni church, Vâlcea County, in 1584.

In 1600, the sometime master of Făgăraș Citadel, Michael the Brave, gave the castle and the Făgăraș domain to Doamna Stanca. He retreated there after the defeat at Mirăslău (18/28 September 1600) and sheltered his family there until 1601.

Doamna Stanca settled there with their two children, Nicolae Pătrașcu and Lady Florica. Michael built a church for his family in the southern part of the city. After the Battle of Mirăslău, the three were held hostage in the city, and after the killing of the Voivode near Turda, on 9/10 August 1601, Doamna Stanca lived there as a slave.

References

1603 deaths
Royal consorts of Wallachia
Year of birth unknown
Michael the Brave
16th-century Romanian people
17th-century Romanian people
16th-century Romanian women
17th-century Romanian women
17th-century slaves